General elections were held in Western Samoa on 24 February 1973. All candidates ran as independents and voting was restricted to matai and citizens of European origin ("individual voters"), with the matai electing 45 MPs and Europeans two. Following the election, Fiame Mata'afa became Prime Minister for a second term, having previously held the office between 1959 and 1970.

Campaign
Prior to the elections, candidates were decided upon at meetings of chiefs. If there was unanimity, only one candidate would be put forward; if there were disagreements, multiple candidates would be nominated. A total of 160 candidates contested the elections, with twelve seats having only one candidate (seven of whom were incumbents), who were returned unopposed. Former Prime Minister Mata'afa, who held one of the four highest chiefly titles, was challenged by Aupito Tulaniu, an opponent of the domination of Samoan society by chiefs. His candidacy was regarded by several chiefs as the 'work of the devil'.

The incumbent government led by  Tupua Tamasese had become increasingly unpopular since taking office following the 1970 elections. An increase in import duties led to rising food costs and car prices, whilst cabinet infighting and perceived lack of work ethic of some ministers had also been issues.

The Samoa Times reported that the election campaign saw candidates giving away food and money.

Results
Twenty-eight of the forty-seven members were new to the Legislative Assembly, with only eleven incumbent MLAs in contested seats being re-elected. Minister of Education Tuala Paulo, Minister of Finance Tofa Siaosi, Minister of Justice Amoa Tausilia, Minister for the Post Office Fuimaono Moasope and the Speaker Magele Ate were all defeated.

In Gaga'ifomauga No. 1 the result was a tie between Tiapili Filisi and Timu Kolio. The outcome was decided by drawing lots, with Tiapili declared the winner.

Voting in Satupa'itea constituency was delayed until May due to the death of Asiata Lagolago, one of the candidates.

Aftermath
Following the elections, the victory of Mapuilesua Malo in Palauli-le-Falefa was challenged by losing candidate Le Tagaloa Pita, who alleged that ten matai should not have been able to vote in the constituency. A recount was ordered by Chief Justice Gaven Donne, with Pita subsequently declared the winner.

Toleafoa Talitimu was elected Speaker with 28 votes, defeating Leaupepe Faimaala (12) and Teo Fetu (6). Fetu subsequently defeated Faimaala in the Deputy Speaker election by a margin of 27 votes to 18. Three candidates stood to be Prime Minister; incumbent Tupua Tamasese, former Prime Minister Fiame Mata'afa and Tufuga Efi. In the first round of voting, Mata'afa won with 23 votes; Efi received 13 and Tamasese 9. Mata'afa subsequently appointed a new cabinet.

Mata'afa died in May 1975, after which Tupua Tamasese was appointed as his replacement, also appointing a new cabinet. However, later in 1975 he sacked both Pinati and Saili. Minister for Works Aumua Ioane became the new Finance Minister, while Vaovasamanaia Filipo was appointed as the new Minister for Agriculture, and Tofaeono Tile as Minister for Works to replace Ioane.

See also
List of members of the Legislative Assembly of Western Samoa (1973–1976)

References

Western Samoa
General
Elections in Samoa
Non-partisan elections
Election and referendum articles with incomplete results